"I Have Got The Blues To Day!" is a song published in 1850 with words by Miss Sarah M. Graham and music by Gustave Blessner. The song tells a tale of an evening of entertainment in which the singer imbibed too much. The next day, in various verses, his "little Fannie" fails to call, he is sick, he wonders if his friends are ailing also, etc. Each verse ends with a variation of the theme:
Then I was gayest of the gay,
But I have got the blues to day:
Then I was gayest of the gay,
But I have got the blues to day.

The song as composed by Blessner is in 2/4 time with the tempo as Allegretto.

"I Have Got The Blues To Day!" is often cited as being the first "blues"-titled song.

References

Bibliography
Graham, Sarah M.; Blessner, Gustave. "I Have Got The Blues To Day!" (sheet music). New York: Firth, Pond and Co. (1850).

External links
"I Have Got The Blues To Day!" Library of Congress.
"I Have Got The Blues To Day!" (copyright deposition) Library of Congress.

1850 songs